Mahjong Tiles is a Unicode block containing characters depicting the standard set of tiles used in the game of Mahjong.

Block

Emoji
The Mahjong Tiles block contains one emoji: U+1F004.

It defaults to an emoji presentation and has two standardized variants defined to specify emoji-style (U+FE0F VS16) or text presentation (U+FE0E VS15).

History
The following Unicode-related documents record the purpose and process of defining specific characters in the Mahjong Tiles block:

References

External links
 Test for Unicode support in Web browsers: Mahjong Tiles

Unicode blocks
Unicode blocks with characters for games